Huaceae is a family of plant in the rosids group, which has been classed in the orders Malpighiales, Malvales, and Violales or in its own order Huales.  The APG II system placed it in the clade eurosids I, whereas the APG III system of 2009 and APG IV (2016) place it within the Oxalidales. The family is endemic to central Africa. It contains four species in the following two genera:
 Afrostyrax
 Hua

References

 
Rosid families
Taxa named by Auguste Chevalier